Quarriors! is a pool-building game made by WizKids. In it Players represent a titular mystical warrior, and players roll dice which gives them Quiddity (an in-game currency) which allows them to purchase additional Spell Dice or Creature Dice, which can then be used to attack the opponent.

Quarriors! was released in 2011, and was a nominee for Dice Tower game of the year, Best family game, and most innovative game of the year.

Gameplay
The games have a lot of variability, in that the dice that are available to purchase each game change, so the way they interact can cause a great variety of changes in the game.

It is often praised due to the lack of shuffling needed, as the dice can be readily pulled out of the bag.

Legacy
The game has spawned several expansions, and a port to iOS.

Quarriors! was the basis for WizKids' later Dice Masters series.

Reception
Quarriors has been quite popular with the gaming crowd with many people bringing it to events like Gencon and Penny Arcade Expo. Despite not being for sale, or official representation at Penny Arcade Expo 2011, it got a lot of play time.

Quarriors won the Origins Award for "Best Family, Party or Children's Game of 2012".

References

External links
 WizKids -- Quarriors!

American board games
Eric M. Lang games
Mike Elliott (game designer) games
Origins Award winners
WizKids games